Londoners : the days and nights of London now—as told by those who love it, hate it, live it, left it and long for it is a 2011 book by Canadian-born British author, Craig Taylor.

Synopsis
The book contains 80 different stories written by Londoners and other associated with the city about their perspective on the city. Those who contributed to the book included the woman who voices station announcements on the London Underground, a man who plants trees along Oxford Street, a British Pakistani currency trader and a guardsman at Buckingham Palace

Content
The book is divided into three different parts each one structured around the experiences of Londoners interviewed. The content of the book is then organised as follow:

Part I
 Arriving
 Getting Around
 Seeing the sights
 Earning one's keep
 Loving one another
 Getting on with it

Part II 
 Continuing your journey
 Gleaning on the margins
 Feeding the city
 Climbing the ladder
 Putting on a show
 Going out

Part III
 Making a life
 Getting along
 Keeping the peace
 Staying on top
 Living and dying
 Departing

Reception
The book was widely praised. Londonist declared it 'the best book about London in at least a decade'. In The Observer Alexander Larman wrote that the book was 'immensely enjoyable' and 'Taylor's superb book does full justice to London and its people, and should be enjoyed by everyone, whether they love the place or regret ever having set foot there'. Oona King remarked that'the eloquence of the voices in this book is remarkable' while in the Wales Arts Review Adam Somerset wrote 'reading Taylor's exhilarating series of snapshots made me want to run for the first train to Euston.
The book was also praised in The New York Times and featured on the BBC

References

2011 non-fiction books
Books about London
Oral history books
Granta Books books